Nida Waseem (born 1 November 1982, Karachi) is a former tennis player from Pakistan.

Background 
Waseem was born in Karachi. She started playing tennis when she was about 7 and continued with as she enjoyed the sport. Her parents encouraged and supported her. She earned her bachelor's degree from Boston College, Boston, United States and her law degree from the UK.

Career 
She was once the Pakistan's youngest national champion and was a dominant force on the national scene during her teenage years. At an International Tennis Federation (ITF) junior ranking event, held in Islamabad in 2000, she beat the Indian player, Sania Mirza. As a junior, she was in the top 10 players in Asia. She took a break while she pursued her studies though she continued playing college tennis in the USA. While at Boston College she was the captain of the tennis team.

National 
Waseem represented Sindh in domestic tournaments. At the 30th National Games held at the CDGK Sports Complex in Karachi in 2007, Waseem won three golds: singles, doubles and team. In singles, she beat Army's Natasha Afridi, 6-2 and 6–4. She paired with Farah Khurshid to beat the Army pair of Sara Mahboob Khan and Natasha Afridi, 6-2 and 6–2.

International 
Waseem played in her first Fed Cup match as a 14 year old against Philippines' Marisue Jacutin on 11 March 1997 in Wellington, New Zealand. She went on to lose it in 2 straight sets (0-6, 0-6).

Singles 

 Ties:13
 Matches: 13 
 W-L: 4-9

Doubles

Awards 
Waseem was awarded the President's Pride of Performance medal (2008) for her services to tennis. The medal was accompanied by a cheque of Rs. 0.3 million.

References

External links 
 

1982 births
Living people
Pakistani female tennis players
People from Sindh
People from Karachi
Recipients of the Pride of Performance
Tennis players at the 1998 Asian Games